The Hjort Fracture Zone is an undersea fracture zone in Antarctica. The name was approved by the Advisory Committee for Undersea Features in December 1971.

References

Geology of the Southern Ocean